The Rice Brothers 2 is follow-up album recorded by guitarist Tony Rice and his brothers Ron, Larry and Wyatt.

Track listing 

 "Walk on Boy" (Mel Tillis, Wayne Walker) 3:14
 "Jared's Rag" (Wyatt Rice) 3:26
 "Lonesome Highway" (Jackson, Yates) 3:56
 "That's When I'll Stop Loving You" (Larry Rice) 2:31
 "Road to Columbus" (Kenny Baker, Bill Monroe) 3:02
 "Darcy Farrow" (Tom Campbell, Steve Gillette) 3:59
 "Sawing on the Strings" (Trad.) 2:09
 "All That You Ask" (Goss) 4:19
 "Bill Cheatham" (Trad.) 2:10
 "Old Time Riverboat Man" (Hartford) 4:06
 "Buttons and Bows" (Jay Livingston) 3:17
 "Southern Accents" (Tom Petty) 3:59

Personnel
Tony Rice – guitar, vocals
 Wyatt Rice - guitar
 Larry Rice - mandolin, vocals
 Ron Rice - bass
 Bill Emerson - banjo, vocals
 Frank Poindexter - Dobro
 Jerry Douglas - Dobro
 Rickie Simpkins - violin, viola
 Jon Carroll - piano, vocals

References

1994 albums
Tony Rice albums
Rounder Records albums